Nengke Township (Mandarin: 能科乡) is a township in Jainca County, Huangnan Tibetan Autonomous Prefecture, Qinghai, China. In 2010, Nengke Township had a total population of 1,976 people: 1,027 males and 949 females: 422 under 14 years old, 1,385 aged between 15 and 64 and 169 over 65 years old.

References 

Township-level divisions of Qinghai
Huangnan Tibetan Autonomous Prefecture